Charlotte des Essarts (1580-1651), was a French noblewoman. She was the mistress to Henry IV of France in 1607–1609. She had two daughters with the king. She was a lady-in-waiting to the queen, Maria de Medici. She participated in many political plots at court.

She was the daughter of François de Essarts, seigneur de Sautour, an equerry of the king, and his second wife Charlotte de Harlay de Chanvillon.

Before coming to the French court, Charlotte des Essarts had been a member of the household of the French ambassador in London, Christophe de Harlay, Count of Beaumont and his wife Anne Rabot. She was a relation of Beaumont.

References 

 Hugh Noel Williams: Last loves of Henri of Navarre. Hutchinson, London [19xx], S. 184–187

1580 births
1651 deaths
17th-century French people
Mistresses of Henry IV of France
French ladies-in-waiting
Household of Marie de' Medici